Apletodon pellegrini, the chubby clingfish, is a species of clingfish of the family Gobiesocidae. The species is found in the Eastern Atlantic, from Madeira, Cape Verde, Canary Islands, Annobon Islands, mainland shore from Cape Blanco south to Port Alfred, South Africa.

Etymology
The cling fish is named in honor of French ichthyologist Jacques Pellegrin (1873-1944).

References

Briggs, J.C., 1990. Gobiesocidae. p. 474-478. In J.C. Quero, J.C. Hureau, C. Karrer, A. Post and L. Saldanha (eds.) Check-list of the fishes of the eastern tropical Atlantic (CLOFETA). JNICT, Lisbon; SEI, Paris; and UNESCO, Paris. Vol. 1.

pellegrini
Taxa named by Paul Chabanaud
Fish described in 1925